AAW Wrestling (AAW) or AAW: Professional Wrestling Redefined and formerly known as All American Wrestling, is an American independent professional wrestling promotion, based in the Chicago area - originally holding shows in Berwyn, Illinois, and now in Merrionette Park.

History
The company was established in 2004 in Berwyn, Illinois. Events were largely held in the Berwyn Eagles Club until 2015, when a majority of shows began being held at 115 Bourbon St. in Merrionette Park, Illinois. Currently, events are held at the Logan Square Auditorium and 115 Bourbon Street among others.  AAW has also held events in Illinois in Carpentersville, Highwood, Milan, Palatine, Arlington Heights, and Pontiac, as well as in Iowa in Davenport and Donahue.

AAW originally stood for All American Wrestling but has been simply recognized as AAW since the start of 2007. Tony Scarpone owned and ran AAW from its start in 2004 through May 2005, when Danny Daniels and Jim Lynam began running the company. Daniels and Lynam then purchased AAW in December 2005.

Championships 
Complete championship histories are available by clicking the links in the Championship column in the table below.

Roster

Male wrestlers

Female wrestlers

See also
List of independent wrestling promotions in the United States

References

External links
 Official website
 AAW roster
 AAW Vanguard roster

Berwyn, Illinois
American independent professional wrestling promotions
Independent professional wrestling promotions based in the Midwestern United States
Entertainment companies established in 2004
2004 establishments in Illinois